El Cielo is the second album from the American progressive/alternative rock band, dredg.  It was released on October 8, 2002 by Interscope Records. Like dredg's first album, Leitmotif, El Cielo is a concept album. The title can be translated to mean "the sky" or "the heaven" in Spanish, and to mean "peace and freedom of expression" in dreams.

Recording
The album was recorded at George Lucas' Skywalker Ranch in Nicasio, CA, and at Long View Farm in North Brookfield, MA. Producers included Ron St. Germain, Tim Palmer, and Michael Rosen.

El Cielo has also been released in the SACD format.  This particular disc is a multi-channel hybrid SACD.  It is playable as a standard CD in a normal CD player.  However, in an SACD player, the album is played in high resolution audio with surround sound.

Song Details
The song "Brushstroke: Reprise" can be divided in two parts, the first part is a 40-second alternate version of the song "Same ol' Road" (hence the title "reprise"). The second part is an extract from a song called "Wind at the End", which was recorded by the band but not released on any studio album, EP, or DVD.

A demo of the song "Of the Room" appeared on their 2001 Industry Demos EP, and later on Extended Play for the Eastern Hemisphere.

Inspiration 
One of dredg's main influences on the album, El Cielo, was a painting by Salvador Dalí entitled Dream Caused by the Flight of a Bee Around a Pomegranate a Second Before Awakening, which is also what the acronym in the title "Brushstroke: dcbtfoabaaposba", stands for ("one" second instead of "a" second). The painting clearly influences many of the album's core themes and song titles.  For example, in the painting there is a long-legged elephant ("An Elephant In The Delta Waves") with a papal insignia upon its back. "The Papal Insignia" was a song recorded for El Cielo but only saw release of Industry Demos, recorded in 2001, and didn't make it onto El Cielo. Also pictured in the painting is a woman lying in a canyon: "The Canyon Behind Her" is the title of the last song on the album.

This is further supported by the translation of the Japanese spoken words from the beginning of "The Canyon Behind Her": "This album was inspired by a painting titled 'Dream Caused By the Flight of a Bee Around a Pomegranate One Second Before Awakening'. It is recommended that you view this painting as you listen to El Cielo. It is as if one stimulus awakens other senses. In other words, it's about 'drawing music'".

Band members have also been quoted as saying that this Dalí painting symbolizes sleep paralysis, a literal representation of the condition from which Dalí's wife actually suffered.  The booklet with El Cielo contains letters written by sufferers of sleeping disorders with descriptions of various experiences with or relating to sleep paralysis. Singer/Songwriter Gavin Hayes incorporates and expands upon the material found in the booklet for the lyrics to the album.

Packaging 
Early pressings of El Cielo were in a digipack with pictures of clouds bordered by runes.  Later pressings of El Cielo are in a  jewel case.  The cover of the later versions is the cover of the booklet, which is a sort of brown leathery texture with the band's name and the album name on it (although jewel case versions with the "clouds" cover are known to exist).  The image provided on this page is the cover of the digipack version. The booklet which came with versions featuring the "clouds" cover are in full color, the booklet included in copies featuring the "brown leather" cover are in black and white, except for the limited digipak version. This version has a clouds packaging with the brown leather booklet in full color. All releases of the album contain the same disc except for the limited jewel case version, which disc is yellow and white and the SACD version which is an all-white gold disc with blue writing.

Track listing

Personnel
dredg
 Gavin Hayes – vocals, acoustic guitar, mandolin
 Mark Engles – guitars
 Drew Roulette – bass
 Dino Campanella – drums, piano
Additional musicians
 Ron Saint Germaine – vocals
 Zack Hexum – saxophone
 Greg Ellis – percussion
Production
 Ron Saint Germain - production on tracks 1-6, 8-11, 13-16, mixing on track 1, 8, 10, 13
 Tim Palmer - production on track 7 and 16, mixing (at Track Record Studios in Hollywood)
 Micheal Rosen - mixing , production on "Of The Room" (track 12)

Music videos
 "Same ol' Road" directed by American McGee.
 "Of the Room" directed by Ben Rehki.

Crickets

The Crickets DVD was a promotional item that was to be given away with copies of Dredg's second album, El Cielo, on tour. It was first given away by band members during the March 2003 SnoCore tour.  As this concert was not heavily advertised many fans were unaware the event was taking place, never receiving a copy. In an effort to make up for this, for a limited amount of time anyone who spent $50 or more at dredg's webstore received a signed copy with their purchase.

The DVD consists of three sections. The first is the band's Electronic Press Kit,  the second a long video entitled "An Elephant in Halong Bay" which begins with the El Cielo track "Brushstroke: An Elephant in the Delta Waves" and ends with "Halong Bay", a b-side from the El Cielo recording sessions. Around eight minutes of footage in between the two tracks shows various video clips of the band. Two other b-sides played during the videos include "walter's sound track" & "birds". The third section of the DVD is the music video for "Same ol' Road".

The DVD is now out of print.

Track listing
 "E.P.K."
 "An Elephant in Halong Bay"
 "Same ol' Road"

References

External links
 A good resource for Sleep Paralysis, one of the themes of the album
 
 Analysis of El Cielo

Dredg albums
Universal Records albums
2002 albums
Albums produced by Ron Saint Germain